Kakinagimak Lake is a lake in Saskatchewan, Canada. It lies in low-relief forested terrain of the Canadian Shield. The climate is sub-arctic.

Location

There is a fishing cabin on the lake.

Terrain

It has  of shoreline.
Most of the region is underlain by granodiorite to tonalite gneisses, which are exposed on the shores of the central portion of the lake.
Robbestad Lake, McArthur Lake and the northern part of Kakinagimak Lake drain northward into the Churchill River via the Nemei River.
The southern part of Kakinagimak Lake drains south into the Wildnest-Sturgeon-Weir River System, then into the Saskatchewan River.

Environment

The lake is in the subarctic climate zone.
The lake is surrounded by coniferous forest.
The lake is home to northern pike, walleye and lake trout.
The water is clear.

See also
List of lakes of Saskatchewan

Notes

Sources

Lakes of Saskatchewan